Dolichoderus abruptus is a species of ant in the genus Dolichoderus. Described by Smith in 1858, the species is endemic to Bolivia, Brazil, Colombia, Ecuador and Peru.

References

Dolichoderus
Hymenoptera of South America
Insects described in 1858